Panchbibi Lal Bihari Pilot Government High School is a secondary school situated in Panchbibi Upazila, Joypurhat District, in northern Bangladesh. It was established in 1904, and nationalized in 1986.

References

High schools in Bangladesh
Schools in Joypurhat District
1904 establishments in India